Zhao Shuo (died 597 BCE), posthumously known as Zhao Zhuangzi(Zhuangzi of Zhao), was a vassal lord of the state of Jin. He was the son of Zhao Dun.

Life 
In 597 BCE, Zhao Shuo participated in the Battle of Bi between the states of Jin and Chu. He was the commander of the lower army; one of the three armies of Jin. 

He was presumably murdered during the disaster of Xiagong. However, no other mentions of Zhao Shuo were found in Zuo Zhuan, the primary historical record of the Spring and Autumn period.

In 583 BCE, Duke Jing of Jin attacked the vassal State of Zhao. Xuanzi's brothers Zhao Tong and Zhao Kuo were killed. Han Jue lamented Zhao's imminent fall. He reasoned with Duke Jing by arguing that Xuanzi served loyally the state of Jin. According to Han Jue, Zhao Shuo had died before the year of 583 BCE. The only remaining successor was Zhao Wu, Zhao Shuo's son. 

With the help of Han Jue, Zhao's power was restored and Zhao Wu succeeded his father.

Sources 

Monarchs of Zhao (state)
Zhao (state)
Zhou dynasty nobility